Strictly Sexual is a 2008 comedy film directed by Joel Viertel, written by Stevie Long, and starring Amber Benson, Johann Urb, Kristen Kerr, Stevie Long, and Trevor Murphy.

Synopsis 
In Los Angeles, the wealthy aspirant writer Donna and her best friend (also aspirant designer) Christi Ann are bored of relationships and decide to chase two escorts in a bar for a one night stand. Meanwhile, construction workers and best friends, Stanny and Joe, come from New York but can't find jobs in Los Angeles. Without money, the guys decide to go to a fancy bar to drink and leave the place without paying the bill. Donna and Christi Ann meet Stanny and Joe and invite them home believing they are gigolos. After a night of sex, the women discover the misunderstanding and that the men are, indeed, unemployed construction workers. The women offer to have the men stay in their swimming pool cabana, furnishing them with beer and food while the boys search for jobs. In return, they would be their on-call "boy-toys" in a strictly sexual relationship. During the ensuing months, the couples become closer and change their feelings and behaviors with the development and growing of their relationships as the couples begin to develop romantic feelings.

Cast 
Amber Benson as Donna
Johann Urb as Joe
Kristen Kerr as Christi Ann
Stevie Long as Stanny
Trevor Murphy as Damian
Brooke Allen as Cassandra
Elizabeth Wood as Fabric Woman
Ashley Hinson as Boutique Employee
Shravan Kambam as Niki
Scott Weston as Scott
Rick Ramnath as Rich
Lindsay Frame as Complimentary Woman
Carlos Conrado Sanchez as Carlos
Justin Phillips as Justin
Mark Radcliffe as Mark

Business 
NPR reported that Strictly Sexual was the most-watched film of all time on Hulu.com as of February 2010.

TV series 
In 2011, Hulu produced a six-episode spin-off series, Strictly Sexual: The Series, featuring some of the original cast.

References

External links

Strictly Sexual at Hulu

2008 films
2000s English-language films
American comedy films
2000s American films